Ephialtes (Ephialtēs; although Herodotus spelled it as , Epialtes) was the son of Eurydemus of Malis. He betrayed his homeland, in hope of receiving some kind of reward from the Persians, by showing the army of Xerxes a path around the allied Greek position at the pass of Thermopylae, which helped them win the Battle of Thermopylae in 480 BC.

Betrayal
The allied Greek land forces, which Herodotus states numbered no more than 4,200 men, had chosen Thermopylae to block the advance of the much larger Persian army. Although this gap between the Trachinian Cliffs and the Malian Gulf was only "wide enough for a single carriage", it could be bypassed by a trail that led over the mountains south of Thermopylae and joined the main road behind the Greek position. Herodotus notes that this trail was well known to the locals, who had used it in the past for raiding the neighboring Phocians.

The Persians used the trail to outflank the defenders. The Spartan king, Leonidas, sent away most of the Greeks, but he himself remained behind with a rear guard composed of his men, the Thespian contingent and a Theban detachment.

Ephialtes expected to be rewarded by the Persians, but this came to nothing when they were defeated at the Battle of Salamis. He then fled to Thessaly; the Amphictyons at Pylae had offered a reward for his death. According to Herodotus, he was killed for an apparently unrelated reason by Athenades of Trachis, around 470 BC, but the Spartans rewarded Athenades all the same.

Others
Herodotus notes that two other men were accused of betraying this trail to the Persians: Onetas, a native of Carystus and son of Phanagoras; and Corydallus, a native of Anticyra. Nevertheless, he argues Ephialtes was the one who revealed this trail because "the deputies of the Greeks, the Pylagorae, who must have had the best means for ascertaining the truth, did not offer the reward on the heads of Onetas and Corydallus, but for that of Ephialtes."

In popular media
In the 1962 film The 300 Spartans, Ephialtes was portrayed by Kieron Moore and is depicted as a shady farmhand who worked on a goat farm near Thermopylae. He betrays the Spartans to the Persians because he was spurned by the Spartan maiden, Ellas, thinking he could win her over by dangling riches he thought he would later have. 

Frank Miller's 1998 comic book miniseries 300, the 2006 film adaptation of the same name, and the 2014 sequel, portray Ephialtes (played in the films by Andrew Tiernan) as a severely deformed Spartan exile whose parents fled Sparta to protect him from the infanticide he would have surely suffered as a disfigured infant. Although he is brave and his spear thrust more than adequate, he cannot raise his arm so he cannot be part of the phalanx, a vital part of the Spartan battle formation. Leonidas asks him to support his brethren by bringing the wounded water and clearing the dead from the battleground. In anger, Ephialtes swears to prove his parents and Leonidas wrong as he betrays them by revealing to Xerxes a hidden route that the Persian army could use to outflank the Greek defenders. When only a handful of Spartans are left when the Persians descend, Ephialtes, in Persian uniform, is with them. Leonidas gives him a blessing to live forever, which functions as an insult since a Spartan's greatest honor is to die in battle.

Name
After the betrayal of Ephialtes, the name "Ephialtes" received a lasting stigma; it came to mean "nightmare" in the Greek language and to symbolize the archetypal traitor in Greek culture, similar to Judas in Christian culture and to Benedict Arnold in the American historical memory.

See also

 Battle of Traigh Ghruinneart, where a dwarf switches sides and kills the leader of the forces he originally was to fight for.
 Martín Alhaja, who had a similar role in the Medieval Battle of Las Navas de Tolosa

References

External links
 Herodotus 7.213 from Perseus Project.

5th-century BC Greek people
Battle of Thermopylae
Greek people of the Greco-Persian Wars
Medism
People from Phthiotis
Year of birth unknown
470s BC deaths
Goatherds
Greek defectors
Traitors in history